, Op. 16, is an opera in one act by Alexander von Zemlinsky composed in 1915–16 to a libretto adapted by the composer from a German translation by  of Oscar Wilde's unfinished play A Florentine Tragedy.

Performance history
The opera was premiered at the Staatsoper Stuttgart on 30 January 1917 under the direction of Max von Schillings. Further productions followed in Prague, Vienna and Graz the same year. The work was also staged in Leipzig (1922), Aachen (1924), Schwerin (1925), and Freiburg im Breisgau (1927). The last production during Zemlinsky's lifetime was in Brno in 1928. It lasts under one hour and is generally paired with another work when performed.

The score is published by Universal Edition Vienna.

Roles

Instrumentation 
3  flutes (3rd doubling piccolo), 3 oboes (3rd doubling English horn), 3 clarinets in B flat/A (3rd doubling E flat clarinet), bass clarinet, 3 bassoons (3rd doubling contrabassoon);
6 horns, 4 trumpets, 3 trombones, bass tuba;
timpani, percussion (cymbals, bass drum, side drum, triangle, tambourine, tam-tam, sleigh bells, xylophone, glockenspiel), harp, celesta, mandoline;
strings

Synopsis
Place: Simone's residence in Florence
Time: 16th-century

Simone, a Florentine merchant, suspects that he is being cuckolded by Prince Guido whom he discovers at home with his wife Bianca on returning from a business trip. He sells Guido a robe and offers the prince everything that he has in his house; Guido chooses Bianca. Simone takes Bianca to her room and asks her to spin, which she refuses to do. After he leaves, Bianca declares that she hates her husband and wishes him dead. Overhearing this, Simone reflects further on adultery and death. He leaves Guido and Bianca alone together and the two lovers express their devotion. When Guido is about to go home, Simone challenges him to a fight, first with swords, then with daggers, before Simone finally overcomes Guido and strangles him. Bianca, admiring her husband's strength, rushes to embrace him and the two are reconciled as the curtain falls.

Recordings 
[Conductor/Bianca/Guido/Simone]
Friedrich Pleyer/Sigune Von Osten/Werner Götz/Heinz Jürgen Demitz, Fonit Cetra (1980, live at La Fenice)
Gerd Albrecht/Doris Soffel/Kenneth Riegel/Guillermo Sarabia, Schwann (1984)
Riccardo Chailly/Iris Vermillion/Heinz Kruse/Albert Dohmen, Decca (1996)
James Conlon/Deborah Voigt/David Kuebler/Donnie Ray Albert, EMI (1997, live in Cologne)
Armin Jordan/Iris Vermillion/Victor Lutsiuk/Albert Dohmen, Naive (2004)
Vladimir Jurowski/Heike Wessels/Sergey Skorokhodov/Albert Dohmen, LPO (2014)
 Bertrand de Billy/Heidi Brunner/Charles Reid/Wolfgang Koch, Capriccio (2018)

References
Notes

Sources
 Batta, András (2000), Opera – Komponisten, Werke, Interpreten (Könemann Verlagsgesellschaft mbH, Dutch translation)
 Clayton, Alfred (1992), "Florentinische Tragödie, Eine" in The New Grove Dictionary of Opera, ed. Stanley Sadie (London)

External links

Operas by Alexander Zemlinsky
1917 operas
Operas set in Florence
One-act operas
German-language operas
Operas based on works by Oscar Wilde
Operas
Operas based on plays